This Week’s Music is an American syndicated half-hour television show originally hosted by Livingston Taylor, brother of singer James Taylor. Similar to American Bandstand, the show featured dancers in a studio, music videos of popular hits, and live musical guests. In 1984 the show aired five days a week in some markets. Many consider this show as the predecessor to Club MTV. Courteney Cox (prior to her appearance in the Dancing in the Dark video) and New York radio personality Al Bandeiro took over for Livingston Taylor toward the end of the show's run.

This Week’s Music is a joint production of The Entertainment Television Company and Viacom International. The show’s Executive Producers are Charles Koppelman and Martin Bandier.

Studio Dancers

Myra Bazell
Frank Chaves
Bonnie Comley
Meghan Doyle
Taro Anthony
Rachael Goodman
Michael Kagdis
Jim Manning
Lori Macpherson
Margaret Molz
Louis Ritarossi
Ronnie Robinson
Myles Thoroughgood
J. Buzz Von Ornsteiner
Lisa Washington
Michael Landsman
Tommy Gibbons
LaTrice Verrett
Ernest Verrett
Carle Anthony Payne
Charlie Mount
Terry(Theresa Fiorillo) Adams

Notable Musical Guests
Paul McCartney
Comateens
Cyndi Lauper
Billy Ocean
Jon Bon Jovi
 Menudo (band)
Dan Hartman
Van Stevenson
Chequered past with Tony Fox Sales
Flock of Seagulls
Berlin
Mama's Boys
Honeymoon Suite
Face to Face
New Edition
Alfonso Ribeiro
Chaka Khan
Patty Smyth
Bananarama

External links
 

1984 American television series debuts
Year of television series ending missing
1980s American music television series
1980s American variety television series
Dance television shows
First-run syndicated television programs in the United States
English-language television shows